Daniel Curtis was an American politician from New York.

He lived in Granville, New York, and was a member from Washington and Clinton counties of the New York State Assembly in 1791 and 1792-93.

Members of the New York State Assembly
Year of birth missing
Year of death missing
People from Granville, New York